The canton of Gravona-Prunelli is an administrative division of the Corse-du-Sud department, southeastern France. It was created at the French canton reorganisation which came into effect in March 2015. Its seat is in Afa.
It takes its name from the Gravona and Prunelli rivers, which both flow through the canton.

It consists of the following communes:

Afa
Appietto 
Bastelica 
Bocognano 
Carbuccia 
Cuttoli-Corticchiato 
Ocana 
Peri 
Sarrola-Carcopino 
Tavaco 
Tavera 
Tolla 
Ucciani 
Valle-di-Mezzana 
Vero

References

Cantons of Corse-du-Sud